Sri Lankan passports are issued to citizens of Sri Lanka for the purpose of international travel. The Department of Immigration and Emigration is responsible for issuing Sri Lankan passports.

Immigration and Emigration Department has begun to issue biometric passports according to international standards with effect from 10 August 2015

Types

 Ordinary Passport (Maroon  ) - Issued for ordinary travel, such as vacations and business trips
Valid for all countries  
Valid for specified countries (Discontinued from 31 December 2018)
 Official Passport (Red  ) - Issued to individuals representing the Sri Lankan government on official/state business
 Diplomatic Passport (Light Red  ) - Issued to Sri Lankan diplomats, top ranking government officials and diplomatic couriers.
 Emergency Certificate (Silver  )
Valid for India and Nepal (for Pilgrimage and medical treatment) (Discontinued from 31 December 2018)
 Non Machine Readable Passports (Brown  ) - Issued by Sri Lanka Missions under special circumstances

All newly issued passports for adults will have a maximum validity of ten years from the date of issue under the Immigrants and Emigrants Act, regardless of when the previous passport (if any) was issued.

Cost and Validity

(This fine is charged only if the 10 year validity period of the passport has not lapsed.)

Data included
The Sri Lankan passport includes the following data:
Photograph of the holder (digital image printed on page)
Type ('PA' or 'PB' for Ordinary Passport, 'PC' for Official Passport and 'PD' for Diplomatic Passport)
Country code ('LKA' for Sri Lanka)
Passport No. (Starting with 'N'  for Ordinary Passport, 'OL' for Official Passport and 'D' for Diplomatic Passport)
Surname
Other Names
National Status ('SRI LANKAN')
Date of Birth (DD/MM/YYYY)
Sex 'M' for Male and 'F' for Female
Place of Birth (only the city or town is listed)
Date of Issue (DD/MM/YYYY)
Date of Expiry (DD/MM/YYYY)
Profession
ID No. (National Identity Card Number)
Holder's Sign (digital signature printed on page)
Authority Colombo (digital signature of Controller General of Immigration and Emigration)

The information page ends with the Machine Readable Zone.

Biometric Passport
From the 10 August 2015, all newly issued passports are to be enabled with Biometric interfaces to allow holders to be applicable for 'Visa Waiver Programmes' (VWP) available in certain countries. The passport is valid like the Machine Readable PP for 10 yrs. from issuance. The Sri Lankan passport is ranked very poorly in global visa free access lists. 

The Sri Lankan government has not issued the e-passport because of procurement inefficiencies.

Citizens interested to receive this or renew their existing passport are to be photographed by authorized photo studios around the island and be present for "fingerprint scanning' at the office in Colombo and other major cities. A list of authorized studios are available here.

IMPORTANT INFORMATION: (as at 10/08/2015)

All passport applicants irrespective of age should use passport Application Form K 35A
All passport applicants including children should provide digital photograph through Authorized  photo studio
Fingerprints will be collected from all applicants above 16 years at the head office and three regional offices in Sri Lanka
Applicants submitting passport applications through Sri Lanka Diplomatic Missions overseas could do so without providing fingerprints and digital photograph. Holders of such passports could provide fingerprints   on their first arrival in Sri Lanka at the head office or any of the regional offices of the Department.
Inclusion of children in parents passport will  NO longer be allowed and children will be issued separate passports
Children below 16 years of age whose passports are issued after 10 August 2015 are required to provide fingerprints to the Department upon reaching the age of 16 years. Holders of such passports living abroad should do so upon first arrival in Sri Lanka.
No Emergency Certificate (EC) shall be issued for applicants below  60 years

Sri Lankan  Passport for a Dual Citizen 
Sri Lanka allows dual citizenship. However, under the 19th amendment of that country's constitution. An individual who holds citizenship in both Sri Lanka and another country can obtain a Sri Lankan passport.

An individual who holds citizenship in both Sri Lanka and another country can obtain a Sri Lankan passport by submitting the following documents.

 Completed Application Form
 Photo studio acknowledgement
 Dual Citizenship Certificate with a photocopy. (A copy of payment receipt for citizenship Registration may be accepted)
 Foreign passport with any Sri Lankan passport  if there is (with photocopy of Bio data pages)
 National Identity Card with a photocopy.
 Birth Certificate with a photocopy.
For further information: click here to be redirected to the department's website

Note of passport

The passport contains the following note :

Sinhalese:

Tamil:

English:

Visa requirements

As of 30 May 2019, Sri Lankan citizens had visa-free or visa on arrival access to 43 countries and territories, ranking the Sri Lankan passport 95th in the world in terms of travel freedom (tied with the DR Congo and Kosovan passports) according to the Henley Passport Index. Additionally, Arton Capital's Passport Index currently ranks the Sri Lankan passport 87th in the world in terms of travel freedom, with a visa-free score of 46 (tied with the DR Congo, Nigerian and North Korean passports), as of 7 February 2019.

For an upper middle income country such as Sri Lanka, these rankings are considered to be extremely low. No concerted effort has been made to improve the ranking by the Sri Lankan state. One major implication of the poor ranking has been a brain drain. Successive Sri Lankan governments have disengaged Sri Lanka from its neighbours in South and Southeast Asia by requiring its citizens to obtain visas prior to travel. The sight of long lines outside Foreign High Commissions and Embassies in Colombo is very common.  Likewise, access to major markets such as Hong Kong, Bangladesh, Taiwan, Vietnam and China is also hampered by tedious and complex visa application processes. This has resulted in relatively poor trade and economic integration with ASEAN and SAARC member countries. Likewise the Sri Lankan state spends millions on maintaining an extensive diplomatic service, which is said to bring little or no benefits to its citizens. Many expatriate Sri Lankans have given up their citizenship due to this. This has led to a significant skills shortage.

See also
 Visa requirements for Sri Lankan citizens

References

External links
 Department of Immigration and Emigration - Sri Lanka

Passports by country
Passport